Dream hunter can refer to:
Dream Hunter Rem, an anime OVA series
Sandman: The Dream Hunters, a graphic novella by Neil Gaiman and Yoshitaka Amano
The Dream-Hunter, a book by Sherrilyn Kenyon
Dream Hunter, a non-player character in Kirby's Adventure